Asperger's Are Us is an American comedy troupe. They are the first comedy troupe consisting entirely of people with Asperger syndrome, though their shows do not reference autism at all.

Biography
Asperger's Are Us formed on the North Shore of Massachusetts in the summer of 2010 after New Michael Ingemi, Jack Hanke, and Ethan Finlan graduated from a summer camp where Noah Britton was their counselor.

They have performed over 150 original sketch comedy shows in ten countries and have been interviewed many times by press around the world. They state that their name reflects their "Aspie style of humor, which focuses on dark absurdism and wordplay, which Aspies seem to enjoy a lot".

Examples of their humor include selling death certificates as tour merch "with blank spaces where we filled in the buyer's name, birthday, and cause of death," getting an onstage haircut from a random audience member during several shows, hiring a real CPR training as an opening act at The Kennedy Center, reading an entire Wikipedia article out loud as part of a sketch, performing a puppet show that very dully explains complex economic theory, calling Hawaiian hotels (via speakerphone onstage) to ask detailed questions about valet parking options, and having the audience vote for a specific total stranger in an online children's art competition 

A Duplass Brothers Productions documentary about the troupe was released on Netflix in late 2016. A follow-up, On Tour with Asperger's Are Us, debuted on HBO on 30 April 2019.

Asperger's Are Us disbanded in 2018, but reunited and continued to tour in 2019.

References

External links

2010 establishments in Massachusetts
2018 disestablishments in Massachusetts
American comedy troupes
Asperger syndrome
Sketch comedy troupes
Autism in the United States
Films about disability